11/9 may refer to:

 November 9, US and Asian style date
 Fahrenheit 11/9, an American documentary film
 September 11, used in European style date
 The September 11 attacks, a series of four coordinated terrorist attacks in the United States of America on September 11, 2001
 September, 11 A.D.; see AD 11
 November, 9 A.D.; see AD 9
 11 shillings and 9 pence in UK predecimal currency
 "11/9", an episode of American Horror Story: Cult

See also 
 September 11 attacks (disambiguation)
 119 (disambiguation)
 9/11 (disambiguation)